Sanhe is a township of Tongjiang County in northeastern Sichuan province, China, located  southeast of the county seat. , it has eight villages under its administration.

References 

Township-level divisions of Sichuan
Tongjiang County